Steven Mark Ward Reed  (born 12 November 1963) is a British politician who has been Shadow Secretary of State for Justice since November 2021. A member of the Labour and Co-operative party, he has been Member of Parliament (MP) for Croydon North since a 2012 by-election. 

Reed was Shadow Secretary of State for Communities and Local Government from 2020 to 2021. Prior to his election to Parliament, he was leader of Lambeth London Borough Council from 2006 to 2012.

Early life and career
Reed was born and raised in St Albans, Hertfordshire. His family worked at Odhams printing factory in Watford until it closed down in 1983. Around this time, he joined the Labour Party.  He went on to study English at Sheffield University. He worked in the educational publishing industry from 1990 to 2008.

Local government career
Reed first stood for the Lambeth London Borough Council in the 1998 election and won the Town Hall ward (now Brixton Hill). In 2002 Labour lost control of Lambeth council to a Conservative/Liberal Democrat coalition and Reed was elected leader of the opposition.

After Labour won back control of Lambeth Council in 2006, Reed was appointed the council's leader. During his tenure, Lambeth was twice rated as London's worst-run borough, with a one-star rating in the Audit Commission's annual inspection in 2006, before being given the same title again in 2012, when Reed left the job for a parliamentary seat. At the 2010 election, Labour gained seats from the Liberal Democrats and Conservatives, making it the first time that Labour had been re-elected to lead in Lambeth for twenty years.

Reed held a number of significant positions in local government. He was:

 Deputy Leader of Local Government Labour, an association representing Labour councillors nationally;
 Deputy Chairman of the Local Government Association;
 London Councils board member for Children's Services and Employment;
 Chairman of Central London Forward, a lobbying group representing five inner-London boroughs;
 A board member representing London's boroughs on the London Enterprise Partnership;
 Co-Chair of the Vauxhall-Nine Elms-Battersea regeneration board;
 Chairman of the London Young People's Education and Skills Board
 Served as a member of the London Board of the Homes and Communities Agency between 2009 and 2011

While a member of Lambeth's Council, Steve Reed introduced a scheme to "Name and Shame" users of recreational drugs. In an interview with the Mirror recounting this he stated "“We wanted to send out the signal that, if you think it’s acceptable to come and buy drugs here, and leave behind you the trail of destruction the drugs trade causes on our streets, we will do everything we can to stop you and we will let your friends, family and employers know what you’ve done.”, he also indicated that a Labour Government would be willing to look at implementing this policy nationwide.

In May 2010, Reed launched a consultation on plans to turn Lambeth into the country's first co-operative council intending to deliver better services more cost-effectively by giving more control to communities and service users, reported in The Guardian newspaper as a possible new model for Labour in local government. The final report of Lambeth Council's Cooperative Council Commission laid out the plans for achieving this objective and Lambeth Council put a transformation plan into effect.

Reed was reported to the Standards Board by a Conservative councillor after he disclosed that she was barred from voting on financial matters because of her refusal to pay council tax on one of her properties for several years. This information was legally disclosable and no sanction was imposed.

Reed was named one of the three most influential council leaders in the country by the Local Government Chronicle in 2011 and was the highest-ranked Labour politician in the 2010 Pink List compiled by The Independent on Sunday.

Reed was appointed Officer of the Order of the British Empire (OBE) in the 2013 Birthday Honours for services to local government.

Parliamentary career
Reed's first attempt to enter Parliament was in Lambeth, contesting the Labour nomination for the Streatham constituency in 2008, on the retirement of Keith Hill. In March of that year, Reed was beaten to the nomination by Chuka Umunna. On 3 November 2012, Reed defeated former Croydon Council leader Val Shawcross by three votes to become the Labour candidate for Croydon North. The by-election followed the death of the former Labour MP for Croydon North Malcolm Wicks, and was won by Reed on 29 November 2012.

In October 2013, Reed was appointed a Shadow Home Office Minister by the Labour leader Ed Miliband.

In the 2015 general election, Reed was re-elected with 33,513 votes (a 62.5% share, up 6.6% from the previous General Election in 2010) and a majority of 21,364 (39.9%) with a 62.3% turnout.

On 27 June 2016, Reed resigned as Shadow Minister for Local Government as part of the mass resignation of the Labour Shadow Cabinet against Jeremy Corbyn's leadership of the Labour party. He supported Owen Smith in the 2016 Labour leadership election.

In June 2018, Reed attempted to get a bill through Parliament to make hospitals reveal details about how and when they use physical force against patients and provide hospital staff with training about unconscious bias against minority groups such as young black men with mental health problems. Reed referred to the death of his constituent, Olaseni Lewis, aged 23 during use of restraint at Bethlem hospital. A filibuster by Conservative MP Philip Davies prevented the bill succeeding. Reed's bill was passed on 6 July 2018; it requires that police attending mental hospitals to apply restraints must wear body cameras.

In April 2020, Keir Starmer appointed him shadow Secretary of State for Communities and Local Government. He does not hold responsibilities for Housing in England; Thangam Debbonaire is Shadow Secretary of State for Housing. It is proposed that if Labour form the next government, they will create a separate government department for housing.

In July 2020, Reed published a tweet labelling the businessman Richard Desmond a "puppet-master", said to be an antisemitic trope. He apologised and deleted the tweet after he found out Desmond was Jewish. Jewish Conservative MP Andrew Percy said "Alluding to Jews as puppet-masters is an age old antisemitic trope and for a Shadow Cabinet member to use this trope is totally unacceptable". Reed subsequently spoke of his longstanding commitment to Labour Friends of Israel.

In the November 2021 shadow cabinet reshuffle, he was appointed Shadow Secretary of State for Justice and Shadow Lord Chancellor.

Personal life
Reed is openly gay.

Notes

References

External links
Steve Reed MP Personal website

Councillor Steve Reed, Lambeth Council (Archived)
Steve Reed The Guardian

Councillors in the London Borough of Lambeth
Labour Party (UK) councillors
1963 births
Alumni of the University of Sheffield
Living people
Gay politicians
LGBT members of the Parliament of the United Kingdom
English LGBT politicians
Officers of the Order of the British Empire
UK MPs 2010–2015
UK MPs 2015–2017
UK MPs 2017–2019
UK MPs 2019–present
Labour Party (UK) MPs for English constituencies
Leaders of local authorities of England